The Seven Mountains are seven mountains that surround the centre of the city of Bergen in Vestland county, Norway. Bergen is often called 'the city between the seven mountains'.

Selection 
Playwright Ludvig Holberg (1684–1754) felt so inspired by the Seven hills of Rome, he decided that his home town must also be blessed with a corresponding seven mountains. Which mountains belong to the group is unclear, due to its origin (based on the mythical status of the number seven), and the fact that several of the mountains are part of the same mountain massif.

Since there are many mountains surrounding Bergen, the definition of the "seven mountains" varies depending on who is defining it. The Bergen Mountain Hiking Association, which organizes an annual 7-mountain hike defines it as Ulriken, Løvstakken, Fløyfjellet, Damsgårdsfjellet, Lyderhorn, Rundemannen, and Sandviksfjellet. The list always includes these four main mountains plus three others:
Ulriken, 
Løvstakken, 
Fløyfjellet, 
Damsgårdsfjellet, 
 plus three from this list:
Askøyfjellet, 
Blåmanen, 
Lyderhorn, 
Rundemanen, 
Sandviksfjellet,

References 

Mountains of Bergen